Zac Woolford (born 9 August 1996) is an Australian rugby league footballer who plays as a  for the Canberra Raiders in the NRL. 

He is the son of former Canberra Raiders player Simon Woolford.

Playing career
Woolford made his first grade debut in round 10 of the 2022 NRL season in his side's 30−10 victory over the Cronulla-Sutherland Sharks at Suncorp Stadium.
Woolford played a total of 17 games for Canberra in the 2022 NRL season as the club finished 8th on the table and qualified for the finals.  Woolford played in both finals matches as Canberra were eliminated in the second week by Parramatta.

References

External links
Canberra Raiders profile

1996 births
Living people
Australian rugby league players
Canberra Raiders players
Rugby league hookers
Rugby league players from Canberra